Corfe & Barrow Hills is a 102.8 hectare biological Site of Special Scientific Interest in Dorset, notified in 1986. One part of it is a Local Nature Reserve also called Corfe & Barrow Hills, while another part is Corfe Hills Local Nature Reserve.

References

Sites of Special Scientific Interest in Dorset
Sites of Special Scientific Interest notified in 1986
Local Nature Reserves in Dorset